Chester Ira Mead (February 19, 1900 – February 11, 1959) was an American football player and coach. He served as the head football coach at Iowa Wesleyan College in Mount Pleasant, Iowa from 1924 to 1925, compiling a record of 6–12. Mead played college football at the University of Iowa from 1920 to 1922.

Head coaching record

References

External links
 

1900 births
1959 deaths
American football guards
Iowa Hawkeyes football players
Iowa Wesleyan Tigers football coaches